Guðrún Fema Ágústsdóttir (born 14 June 1967) is an Icelandic former breaststroke swimmer. She competed in two events at the 1984 Summer Olympics.

References

External links
 

1967 births
Living people
Gudrun Agustsdottir
Gudrun Agustsdottir
Swimmers at the 1984 Summer Olympics
Place of birth missing (living people)
Gudrun Agustsdottir